The Allwinner A1X is a family of single-core SoC devices designed by Allwinner Technology from Zhuhai, China. Currently the family consists of the A10, A13, A10s and A12. The SoCs   incorporate the ARM Cortex-A8 as their main processor and the Mali 400 as the GPU.

The Allwinner A1X is known for its ability to boot Linux distributions such as Debian, Ubuntu, Fedora, and other ARM architecture-capable distributions from an SD card, in addition to the Android OS usually installed on the flash memory of the device.

A1x Features

Video acceleration 
HD video decoding (up to 3840x2160)
Supports popular video codecs, including VP8, AVS, H.264 MVC, VC-1, and MPEG-1/2/4
HD Video Encoding (H.264 High Profile)

Display controller
Multi-channel HD displays
Built-in HDMI
YPbPr, CVBS, VGA
LCD interfaces: CPU, RGB, LVDS up to full 1080p HDTV

Memory
DDR2/DDR3 SDRAM, 32-bit
SLC/MLC/TLC/DDR NAND

Connectivity
USB 2.0
CSI, TS
SD Card 3.0
10/100 Ethernet controller
CAN bus (A10 only)
Built-in SATA 2.0 Interface
I²S, SPDIF and AC97 audio interfaces
PS2, SPI, TWI and UART

Storage and boot devices
NAND flash
SPI NOR flash
SD card
USB
SATA

Implementations
Many manufacturers have adopted the Allwinner A1X for use in devices running the Android operating system and the Linux operating System. The Allwinner A1X is used in tablet computers, set-top boxes, PC-on-a-stick, mini-PCs, and single-board computers.
 PengPod, Linux-based 7 and 10-inch tablets. 
 Gooseberry, a board based on the A10 SoC similar to the Raspberry Pi.
 Cubieboard, a board based the A10 SoC.
 Tinkerforge RED Brick, a board based on the A10s SoC  
 CHIP (computer), a $9 SoC computer based on the A13

Operating System support

Linux support 
The Allwinner A1X architecture is referred to as 'sunxi' in the Linux kernel source tree.  The source code is available at GitHub. At the moment, stable and full hardware support is limited to 3.0.x and 3.4.x kernels. Recent mainline versions of the kernel run, but do not offer NAND access and have only limited 3D-acceleration.

FreeBSD support 
There is a work in progress on support Efika on FreeBSD. At the moment, not all on-board peripherals are working.

OpenBSD support 
As of May 2015, OpenBSD's armv7 port supports the Cubieboard and pcDuino boards based on the Allwinner A1X.

NetBSD support 
NetBSD contains support for the Allwinner A10.

Documentation 
No factory sourced programmers manual is publicly available for the A10S CPU at this moment.

Allwinner A-Series
Apart from the single-core A1x (A10/A13/A10s/A12), two new more powerful Cortex-A7 Allwinner SoCs have been released by Allwinner, the A10-pin-compatible dual-core Allwinner A20, and the quad-core Allwinner A31.

References

External links
 Cubieboard on linux-sunxi
 A13
 A10
 A10s

ARM-based systems on chips